Arumpo is a locality in New South Wales, Australia, approximately  north-east of Mildura, Victoria. The Willandra Lakes Region, including Mungo National Park, is near Arumpo.

References

Towns in New South Wales
Wentworth Shire